Zygophyllum is the type genus of the flowering plant family Zygophyllaceae. The generic name is derived from the  Greek words ζυγόν (zygon), meaning "double", and φυλλον (phyllon), meaning "leaf". It refers to the leaves, each of which have two leaflets. 

The genus is distributed in arid and semi-arid regions of Africa, the Mediterranean Basin, central Asia and Australia.

Molecular phylogenetic analysis suggested that as previously circumscribed, Zygophyllum was not monophyletic, and the genus was split among a number of other genera, including Augea, Fagonia, Roepera and Tetraena.

Species
In accordance with International Plant Names Index, genus Zygophyllum currently has 117 accepted species:

Zygophyllum acerosum (Boiss.) Christenh. & Byng
Zygophyllum aegyptium Hosny
Zygophyllum album L.f.
Zygophyllum applanatum  Van Zyl
Zygophyllum arabicum (L.) Christenh. & Byng
Zygophyllum atriplicoides Fisch. & C.A.Mey.
Zygophyllum augea Christenh. & Byng
Zygophyllum balchaschense Boriss.
Zygophyllum betpakdalense Golosk. & Semiotr.
Zygophyllum borissovae Beier & Thulin
Zygophyllum brachypterum Kar. & Kir.
Zygophyllum bruguieri (DC.) Christenh. & Byng
Zygophyllum bucharicum B.Fedtsch.
Zygophyllum californicum (Benth.) Christenh. & Byng
Zygophyllum charoides (Chiov.) Christenh. & Byng
Zygophyllum chilense (Hook. & Arn.) Christenh. & Byng
Zygophyllum chrysopteron Retief
Zygophyllum clavatum Schltr. & Diels
Zygophyllum coccineum L.
Zygophyllum cornutum Coss.
Zygophyllum creticum (L.) Christenh. & Byng
Zygophyllum cuspidatum Boriss.
Zygophyllum cylindrifolium Schinz
Zygophyllum darvasicum Boriss.
Zygophyllum decumbens Delile
Zygophyllum densispinum (Beier & Thulin) Christenh. & Byng
Zygophyllum densum (I.M.Johnst.) Christenh. & Byng
Zygophyllum dregeanum Sond.
Zygophyllum dumosum Boiss.
Zygophyllum eichwaldii C.A.Mey.
Zygophyllum fabago L.
Zygophyllum fabagoides Popov
Zygophyllum fontanesii Webb & Berthel.
Zygophyllum furcatum C.A.Mey.
Zygophyllum gaetulum Emb. & Maire
Zygophyllum geslinii Coss.
Zygophyllum giessii Merxm. & A.Schreib.
Zygophyllum glutinosum (Delile) Christenh. & Byng
Zygophyllum gobicum Maxim.
Zygophyllum gontscharovii Boriss.
Zygophyllum gypsophilum (Beier & Thulin) Christenh. & Byng
Zygophyllum hadramauticum (Beier & Thulin) Christenh. & Byng
Zygophyllum hamiense Schweinf.
Zygophyllum harpago (Emb. & Maire) Christenh. & Byng
Zygophyllum heterocladum Rech.f. & Patzak
Zygophyllum iliense Popov
Zygophyllum indicum (Burm.f.) Christenh. & Byng
Zygophyllum jaxarticum Popov
Zygophyllum kansuense Y.X.Liou
Zygophyllum karatavicum Boriss.
Zygophyllum kaschgaricum Boriss.
Zygophyllum kegense Boriss.
Zygophyllum kopalense Boriss.
Zygophyllum laeve (Standl.) Christenh. & Byng
Zygophyllum lahovarii (Volkens & Schweinf.) Christenh. & Byng
Zygophyllum latistipulatum (Beier & Thulin) Christenh. & Byng
Zygophyllum lehmannianum Bunge
Zygophyllum loczyi Kanitz
Zygophyllum longicapsulare Schinz
Zygophyllum longistipulatum Schinz
Zygophyllum luntii (Baker) Christenh. & Byng
Zygophyllum macropodum Boriss.
Zygophyllum madagascariense (Baill.) Stauffer
Zygophyllum madecassum H.Perrier
Zygophyllum mahranum (Beier) Christenh. & Byng
Zygophyllum mandavillei Hadidi
Zygophyllum mayanum (Schltdl.) Christenh. & Byng
Zygophyllum melongena Bunge
Zygophyllum microcarpum Licht. ex Cham.
Zygophyllum migiurtinorum Chiov.
Zygophyllum miniatum Cham.
Zygophyllum minutistipulum (Engl.) Christenh. & Byng
Zygophyllum molle (Delile) Christenh. & Byng
Zygophyllum mongolicum (Maxim.) Christenh. & Byng
Zygophyllum mucronatum Maxim.
Zygophyllum neglectum Grubov
Zygophyllum obliquum Popov
Zygophyllum olivieri (DC.) Christenh. & Byng
Zygophyllum orientale (C.Presl) Christenh. & Byng
Zygophyllum ovigerum Fisch. & C.A.Mey. ex Bunge
Zygophyllum oxianum Boriss.
Zygophyllum oxycarpum Popov
Zygophyllum pachyacanthum (Rydb.) Christenh. & Byng
Zygophyllum palmeri (Vasey & Rose) Christenh. & Byng
Zygophyllum pamiricum Grubov
Zygophyllum paulayanum (J.Wagner & Vierh.) Christenh. & Byng
Zygophyllum pinnatum Cham.
Zygophyllum potaninii Maxim.
Zygophyllum prismaticum Chiov.
Zygophyllum prismatocarpum Sond.
Zygophyllum procumbens Adamson
Zygophyllum propinquum Decne.
Zygophyllum pterocarpum Bunge
Zygophyllum pterocaule Van Zyl
Zygophyllum qatarense Hadidi
Zygophyllum retrofractum Thunb.
Zygophyllum rigidum Schinz
Zygophyllum rosowii Bunge
Zygophyllum scabrum (Forssk.) Christenh. & Byng
Zygophyllum scoparium (Brandegee) Christenh. & Byng
Zygophyllum simplex'' L.Zygophyllum sinkiangense Y.X.LiouZygophyllum smithii HadidiZygophyllum somalense HadidiZygophyllum spinosissimum (Blatt. & Hallb.) Christenh. & ByngZygophyllum stapffii SchinzZygophyllum steropterum SchrenkZygophyllum subinerme (Boiss.) Christenh. & ByngZygophyllum subtrijugum C.A.Mey.Zygophyllum sulcatum Huysst.Zygophyllum taldykurganicum Boriss.Zygophyllum tenue R.GloverZygophyllum trialatum Blatt. & Hallb.Zygophyllum turcomanicum Fisch. ex Boiss.Zygophyllum villosum (D.M.Porter) Christenh. & ByngZygophyllum xanthoxylum (Bunge) Maxim.Zygophyllum zilloides'' (Humbert) Christenh. & Byng

References

External links

 
Rosid genera
Taxonomy articles created by Polbot